The Woman in White is a 1929 British silent mystery film directed by Herbert Wilcox (whose main career was as a producer) and starring Blanche Sweet, Haddon Mason and Cecil Humphreys. It was written by Robert Cullen and Herbert Wilcox, based on the 1859 mystery novel The Woman in White by Wilkie Collins.

The film was made at Cricklewood Studios in London and was the first British film version of the novel. Some sources disagree on whether the film was actually made in England or in Scotland, however.

Plot
A recently married heiress named Laura Fairlie keeps seeing visions of a woman in white around her estate. Laura is unaware that her husband Sir Percival Glyde is plotting to steal her inheritance. Her sister Marion learns of the plot, but falls ill before she can warn Laura. When Marion recovers from her illness, she learns that Laura has died and has been buried. Laura's old boyfriend Walter Hartwright discovers however that Laura isn't really dead. It seems Laura had a lookalike (the woman in white) who actually died, and Laura's husband had Laura committed to an insane asylum and pretended that it was she who died.

Cast
 Blanche Sweet - Laura Fairlie / Anne (a dual role)
 Haddon Mason - Walter Hartwright
 Cecil Humphreys - Sir Percival Glyde
 Louise Prussing - Marion Halcombe
 Frank Perfitt - Count Fosco
 Minna Grey - Countess Fosco

Production
The film's art direction was by Clifford Pember. Blanche Sweet played the dual role of both Laura (the heiress) and her lookalike (the woman in white).

Other Versions
Several silent versions were made, one in 1912 and one by Fox in 1917 entitled Tangled Lives.   Another 1917 silent version was filmed by Thanhouser and starred Florence La Badie, which still survives in the Library of Congress. It was remade again in England in 1940 as a horror film called Crimes at the Dark House (starring Tod Slaughter), and remade yet again in 1948.

References

Bibliography
 Low, Rachael. History of the British Film, 1918-1929. George Allen & Unwin, 1971.
 Wood, Linda. British Films, 1927-1939. British Film Institute, 1986.

External links
 
 allrovi/synopsis

1929 films
British mystery films
British silent feature films
1929 mystery films
1920s English-language films
Films based on works by Wilkie Collins
Films directed by Herbert Wilcox
Films set in London
Films set in England
Films shot at Cricklewood Studios
British black-and-white films
British and Dominions Studios films
1920s British films
Silent mystery films